Bossacucanova is a Brazilian musical group.  The group combines traditional bossa nova with electronica.  The group is most notable for having been nominated for a Latin Grammy award in 2002 for Best Brazilian Contemporary Pop Album for their album Brasilidade.  

Among the group's permanent members is Márcio Menescal, son of bossa nova pioneer Roberto Menescal, who appeared on the Brasilidade album, DJ Marcelinho DaLua and the record producer and sound engineer Alex Moreira. On stage the group has special guests, female singer Cris Delanno, guitarist Flávio Mendes, saxophone player Rodrigo Sha and percussionist Dado Brother.

Discography
 1998 Revisited Classics
 2001 Brasilidade with Roberto Menescal
 2004 Uma Batida Diferente
 2005 Ipanema Lounge
 2009 Ao Vivo
 2012 Nossa Onda É Essa!
 2014 Our Kind of Bossa
 2019 Bossa Got the Blues with Roberto Menescal

External links

Bossa nova musicians
Drum and bass music groups
Musical groups established in 1999
1999 establishments in Brazil
Six Degrees Records artists